The Journal of Experimental Marine Biology and Ecology is a peer-reviewed bimonthly journal which publishes work on the biochemistry, physiology, behaviour, and genetics of marine plants and animals in relation to their ecology. According to the Journal Citation Reports, the journal has a 2015 impact factor of 1.796.

References

English-language journals
Publications established in 1967
Biology journals
Ecology journals
Bimonthly journals
Elsevier academic journals
Marine biology